Sails to the Wind is the 1994 debut album from Canadian artist Bruce Guthro. As of 2010, copies of the album are extremely hard to find.

Track listing
 "Running Away" – 4:05
 "I'll Surrender" – 4:06
 "Him and God and Me" – 3:23
 "Cheer Up Buddy" – 2:35
 "I See It From Here" – 3:25
 "Small Town Heroes" – 3:02
 "Sails to the Wind" – 3:51
 "Livin' in the 90's" – 3:40
 "The Back Shore" – 2:19
 "Men of the Deep" – 3:29

1994 debut albums
Bruce Guthro albums
MCA Records albums